Baker is a census-designated place in southeastern White Pine County, Nevada, United States. The town is named after an early settler, George W. Baker. Its population at the 2010 census was 68.

Demographics

Education
Public education is provided through the White Pine County School District. Baker 3-6 Elementary  school is the only school in Baker.

Commercial operations

Lodgings in the community include the Stargazer Inn, which includes the Bristlecone General Store, located at the center of town; the End of the Trail…er, Baker's original bed-and-fix-your-own-breakfast, located at the edge of town; and the Border Inn, located just east of town on the Utah/Nevada border.

Several artists reside in Baker, including Terry Marasco, Margaret Pense, Bill and Kathy Rountree, and "Doc" Sherman.

Notable people
Prominent people from Baker include Calvin Quate, a professor of electrical engineering at Stanford University who is famous for the invention of the atomic force microscope.

In popular culture
In January 1997, Late Show with David Letterman produced a segment on the town, with the show's Biff Henderson touring the area and ending his narrative on Baker with the quote, "It's quiet, peaceful, beautiful and the people are friendly."

See also
 List of census-designated places in Nevada
 Baker Ranger Station

References

External links

Census-designated places in White Pine County, Nevada
Census-designated places in Nevada
Great Basin National Heritage Area